The 2022 Belarusian Premier League was the 32nd season of top-tier football in Belarus. Shakhtyor Soligorsk defended their championship winning the fourth league title in club history.

Teams
The 15th-placed team of the last season Smorgon was relegated to the 2022 Belarusian First League, ending their one-year stay in the top division. Sputnik Rechitsa were excluded from the league halfway through the last season and will not play in any league in 2022. Smorgon and Sputnik were replaced by two best teams of 2021 Belarusian First League (Arsenal Dzerzhinsk, promoted to the top-flight for the first time in their history and Belshina Bobruisk, promoted after a one-year absence).

On 28 February 2022 Rukh Brest withdrew from the league, citing financial troubles caused by international sanctions upon club's owner Alexander Zaytsev and an undisclosed Russian company co-owning the club. A few days later they were replaced by Dnepr Mogilev (5th-placed team of last year's First League season).

League table

Results
Each team plays home-and-away once against every other team for a total of 30 matches played each.

Relegation play-offs 
The 14th-place finisher of this season (Arsenal Dzerzhinsk) plays a two-legged relegation play-off against the third-placed team of the 2022 Belarusian First League (Rogachev) for a spot in the 2023 Premier League.

Rogachev won 5–4 on aggregate.

Top scorers

Awards

Weekly awards

Player of the Week

References

External links
 

2022
Belarus
Belarus
1